Jenny Beavan, OBE (born 1950) is an English costume designer. She has been nominated for the Academy Award for Best Costume Design twelve times, winning three awards for the movies A Room With A View (1985) (for which she shared an award with John Bright), Mad Max: Fury Road (2015), and Cruella  (2021). She has also been nominated nine times for a BAFTA Award, winning four awards for A Room With A View, Gosford Park (2001), Mad Max: Fury Road, and Cruella. Beavan also received a Tony Award nomination for Best Costume Design for the play Private Lives.

Early life
Beavan was born in London, England. Her father was a cellist, and her mother a viola player. She credits them for instilling a strong work ethic. She also has a sister.

Career

Jenny Beavan is known for her work on Merchant Ivory films. In the 1970s, she worked on set design for London theatrical productions. She joined the field of film costume design after obtaining an unpaid position to design garments for a small Merchant Ivory film, Hullabaloo Over Georgie and Bonnie's Pictures. This began her long relationship with Merchant Ivory productions.

She has frequently worked with costume designer John Bright, who runs the costume-rental house Cosprop, and credits him with educating her as she was starting out her career. She said she was helped by "just listening to him and learning from him, learning the history and the politics of clothing". Since then, the two have collaborated on more than ten films together and have shared six Oscar nominations.

In 2016, Beavan won her 3rd BAFTA and 2nd Academy Award in George Miller's post-apocalyptic action film Mad Max: Fury Road.

Beavan was appointed Officer of the Order of the British Empire (OBE) in the 2017 New Year Honours for services to drama production.

In June 2018, Beavan was awarded an Honorary Fellowship by Arts University Bournemouth alongside dancer Darcey Bussell, graphic designer Margaret Calvert OBE and director and screenwriter Edgar Wright.

In 2022, Beavan nabbed her 4th BAFTA, as well as her 3rd Academy Award for Craig Gillespie's Disney live-action spin-off of Cruella.

Personal life 
She has one daughter, Caitlin, a theatre producer born in 1985. They worked together on the West End theatre production of Third Finger Left Hand at Trafalgar Studios in 2013.

Film credits

Accolades 
Academy Awards

The Academy Awards has recognized Beavan's costume work with twelve nominations and three wins, winning Best Costume Design for A Room with a View, Mad Max: Fury Road, and Cruella.

References

External links 
 

Living people
1950 births
Best Costume Design Academy Award winners
Best Costume Design BAFTA Award winners
British costume designers
David di Donatello winners
Emmy Award winners
Officers of the Order of the British Empire
Women costume designers